European route E 35 (E 35) is a north–south European route, running from Amsterdam in the Netherlands to Rome in Italy. In Italy, the highway runs from the Swiss border near Como, to its southern terminus in Rome.

See also

References

External links

35
I